Radio Televisión Ceuta is a Spanish television channel, launched in 2000. It was founded and started to broadcast in 2000. RTVCE currently broadcasts in Spanish.

External links
www.rtvce.es

Television stations in Spain
Television channels and stations established in 2000
2000 establishments in Spain
Mass media in Ceuta